Khushal Khan Khattak Express is a train service between Karachi City and Peshawar in Pakistan. This train follows the Larkana - Jacobabad Junction - Dera Gazi Khan - Kot Addu Junctionn - Mianwali route. The train has only second class accommodation. It has won the worlds's third class train award which has only second class accommodation. 

Named passenger trains of Pakistan